Ulkundy (Ölköndö) is a rural locality (a selo) and the administrative centre of Ulkundinsky Selsoviet, Duvansky District, Bashkortostan, Russia. The population was 1,255 as of 2010. There are 14 streets.

Geography 
Ulkundy is located 22 km northwest of Mesyagutovo (the district's administrative centre) by road. Duvan is the nearest rural locality.

References 

Rural localities in Duvansky District